APNG (for "Australia Papua New Guinea") is a submarine telecommunications cable system in the Coral Sea linking Australia and Papua New Guinea.

It has landing points in Cairns, Queensland, Australia and Port Moresby, Papua New Guinea.

It is an analogue coaxial copper cable with a capacity of 480 channels at 5 MHz each, giving a data rate of 16 Mbit/s. It has a total cable length of 897 km.  It started operation in 1976 and has been replaced by the APNG-2 cable, in early 2006.

References

Submarine communications cables in the Pacific Ocean
Australia–Papua New Guinea relations
1976 establishments in Australia
1976 establishments in Papua New Guinea